"Gorgeous Grampa" is the fourteenth episode of the twenty-fourth season of the American animated television series The Simpsons, and the 522nd episode overall. It originally aired on the Fox network in the United States on March 3, 2013.

Plot
Homer becomes addicted to a reality TV show called Storage Battles (parody of Storage Wars) and decides to participate in a storage unit auction as a result. He wins the storage unit with $1000, outbidding several townspeople and elephant Stampy. The family goes through its contents to find it is full of women's clothes and muscleman magazines belonging to Grampa Simpson. Marge comes to the conclusion that Grampa is a closeted homosexual who was forced to be heterosexual through most of his life. Homer and Marge set Grampa up with Waylon Smithers, but the plan fails when Mr. Burns arrives and scares Smithers off. Marge then admits to Grampa that she thought he was homosexual, to which Grampa becomes enraged and Mr. Burns reveals that Grampa actually used to be an old-time Gorgeous George-type wrestler called "Glamorous Godfrey", whose radical fighting style was heavily despised by the wrestling fan community, forcing him to retire. Burns reveals himself to be Godfrey's biggest fan (and only living one); he then persuades Grampa to return to the wrestling scene, which Grampa does. Though he is again met with loathing, Grampa continues the act under Burns's manipulation.

Bart soon becomes fascinated with Grampa and starts mimicking the mannerisms Grampa uses in the ring. However, he also attracts hatred and it worries Homer and Marge, but pleases Grampa and Burns. Under Burns's supervision, Grampa and Bart partner up in a tag team wrestling match. Marge tries to appeal to Grampa, but he turns her efforts down. However, he changes his mind when he observes Bart harassing the audience and takes on another wrestling identity that he calls "Honest Abe" in order to convince Bart to stop his ways. When Burns protests against this, Grampa and Bart defeat him in the ring. Afterwards, the two retire from wrestling.

Reception

Critical reception
Robert David Sullivan of The A.V. Club gave the episode a B−, saying, "The season has already been heavy on nostalgia and on Grampa appearances, so it's not a pleasant surprise when the Simpsons stumble upon a storage unit with boxes of feather boas, wigs, and perfume sprayers in boxes marked 'Property of Abe Simpson'."

Ratings
The episode received a 2.2 in the 18-49 demographic and was watched by a total of 4.66 million viewers. This made it the most watched show on Fox's Animation Domination line up that night''.

Syndication edits

The "Homer Shake" couch gag was removed from repeated airings in the US and all airings in the UK, presumably due to what it parodies.

References

External links 
 
 "Gorgeous Grampa"  at theSimpsons.com

The Simpsons (season 24) episodes
2013 American television episodes